Rajinder Singh Mor (Arjun Awarded) (born 1 August 1954, in Baroda village in Sonepat district) is an Indian former wrestler and retired DIG Haryana Police. Singh won a gold medal in the 1978 Asian Games. He was the most successful Indian wrestler in the Commonwealth Games with two gold medals, in 1978 and 1982. Singh competed in the 1980 Summer Olympics and 1984 Summer Olympics.

References

External links 
 
 

1954 births
Living people
Indian male sport wrestlers
Olympic wrestlers of India
Wrestlers at the 1980 Summer Olympics
Wrestlers at the 1984 Summer Olympics
Asian Games medalists in wrestling
Asian Games gold medalists for India
Wrestlers at the 1978 Asian Games
Medalists at the 1978 Asian Games
Wrestlers at the 1986 Asian Games
Commonwealth Games medallists in wrestling
Commonwealth Games gold medallists for India
Commonwealth Games silver medallists for India
Wrestlers at the 1978 Commonwealth Games
Wrestlers at the 1982 Commonwealth Games
Recipients of the Arjuna Award
Recipients of the Dhyan Chand Award
Medallists at the 1978 Commonwealth Games
Medallists at the 1982 Commonwealth Games